William Duncan MacMillan (July 5, 1930 - October 31, 2006) was an American businessman, a director of Cargill.
He is not to be confused with Whitney MacMillan, William's first cousin, born in 1929.

Early life
He was born on July 5, 1930, the son of John H. MacMillan, Jr. and Marion Dickson. He graduated from Brown University in Providence, Rhode Island in 1953 and maintained his relationship with the university as a member of the board of trustees and with philanthropic gifts to fund scholarships and build the W. Duncan MacMillan Hall.

Career
MacMillan was a board member of Cargill for three decades. He wrote the MacMillan-Cargill family history and led several companies, some of which he established himself.

Personal life
MacMillan married twice. His first wife, Sarah Stevens, died in 1995. They had four daughters, Sarah MacMillan of California, Katherine Tanner of Florida, and Lucy Stitzer and Alexandra Daitch, both of Connecticut, all of whom survived him. He was also survived by his second wife, Nivin, of Wayzata.

Death
MacMillan died on October 31, 2006 of an apparent heart attack at his winter home near Jupiter, Florida, aged 76.

References

1930 births
2006 deaths
20th-century American businesspeople
Brown University alumni
Cargill people